KNI can refer to:

 KNI A/S or Greenland Trade, a state-owned retail company in Greenland
 Streaming SIMD Extensions
 Katanning Airport, IATA airport code "KNI"